Christine Meier (born 24 May 1986) is a Swiss ice hockey player.

International career
Meier was selected for the Switzerland women's national ice hockey team in the 2006 and 2010 Winter Olympics. In 2010, she scored three assists in five games. In 2006, she scored one goal.

Meier has also appeared for Switzerland at seven IIHF Women's World Championships at two levels. Her first appearance came in 2001.

Career statistics

International career

References

External links

1986 births
Living people
Ice hockey players at the 2006 Winter Olympics
Ice hockey players at the 2010 Winter Olympics
Ice hockey players at the 2018 Winter Olympics
Olympic ice hockey players of Switzerland
People from Bülach
Swiss women's ice hockey defencemen
Swiss expatriate ice hockey people
Swiss expatriate sportspeople in Sweden
Sportspeople from the canton of Zürich